Ampullaria bicarinata is an extinct species of freshwater snail with an operculum, an aquatic gastropod mollusk in the family Ampullariidae.

Distribution 
The type locality of Ampullaria bicarinata is Vrška Čuka (in Serbian Cyrillic: Вршка Чука), eastern Serbia near the border of Bulgaria.

References

Ampullariidae
Prehistoric gastropods
Gastropods described in 1900
Fossils of Serbia